Tomorrow's Another Day is a 2000 French comedy film directed by Jeanne Labrune.

Cast 
 Nathalie Baye - Sophie
 Isabelle Carré - Marie
 Jeanne Balibar - Elisabeth
 Jean-Pierre Darroussin - Xavier
 Sophie Guillemin - Annie
 Didier Bezace - Franck
 Danielle Darrieux - Eva
  - Céline

References

External links 

2000 comedy films
2000 films
French comedy films
2000s French films